Michael Silberbauer (born 7 July 1981) is a Danish football manager and former professional player. He is currently the manager of FC Utrecht in the Dutch Eredivisie.

Silberbauer played more than a 100 games for each Danish club Aalborg BK and FC Copenhagen, winning three Danish Superliga titles with FC Copenhagen. He was capped 25 times for the Denmark national football team, scoring a single goal.

Club career

Aalborg BK
Born in Støvring, Silberbauer started his career playing youth football for local amateur team Støvring IF, before moving to nearby top-flight club Aalborg Boldspilklub (AaB). He made his Danish Superliga debut for AaB in the 3–2 win against defending Superliga champions Herfølge BK on 26 July 2000, and he played 28 of 33 games during the 2000–01 Danish Superliga season. Silberbauer played a total 105 Superliga games for AaB until December 2003, and was named AaB player of the year in both 2001 and 2002.

Copenhagen
In January 2004, Silberbauer moved on to Superliga rivals F.C. Copenhagen (FCK) in a transfer deal reportedly worth between 7–10 million DKK. In his first six months with FCK, he won both the 2003–04 Danish Superliga championship and the 2003–04 Danish Cup trophy. In the spring of 2005, he was in top form, scoring four goals in two games, before he suffered an injury in a game against arch rivals Brøndby IF. He won a further two Danish Superliga titles with FCK, before leaving the club as his contract expired in the Summer 2008.

Utrecht
Silberbauer then moved abroad to play for Eredivisie club FC Utrecht. He was eventually named team captain of Utrecht, and was seen as a leader figure for the young team. With his contract running out in the Summer 2011, Utrecht looked to sell him in the winter 2010 transfer window, with a number of British clubs reportedly interested.

Young Boys Bern
Silberbauer was not sold, and eventually agreed a free transfer move to Swiss Super League club BSC Young Boys in April 2011, effective from July 2011. Silberbauer is on contract until 2015, but is on a loan to Odense Boldklub until summer 2013.

Odense Boldklub
Silberbauer joined OB 3 September 2012 on a one-year loan contract.

International career
At the age of 16, Silberbauer made his international debut for the Danish under-17 national team in August 1997. He participated in the 1998 European Under-16 Championship. Up until November 2003, he played a total 56 games and scored seven goals for the various Danish youth selections, including 24 games and two goals for the Danish under-21 national team.

Silberbauer was selected for the senior Danish national team under national team manager Morten Olsen, and made his debut in the 1–0 friendly game win against Scotland in August 2002. It would be two-and-a-half years and a move to FCK before he added the second game to his tally. It came in March 2005, as he took part in the 3–0 win against Kazakhstan in the 2006 FIFA World Cup qualification tournament. Silberbauer scored his first international goal in his fourth game, a 1–0 friendly win against Finland in June 2005. It came as a surprise to many commentators that Silberbauer was not included in Olsen's squad for the 2010 FIFA World Cup, and Silberbauer himself was so disappointed that he considered ending his international career. Following the World Cup, he was called up for the national team again.

Silberbauer also represented the Denmark League XI national football team, a selection of the best domestic Danish Superliga players managed by Morten Olsen for a number of unofficial international matches. Silberbauer has played an aggregated seven games and scored one goal for the League XI team in 2002, 2004, and 2006.

International goals
Scores and results list Denmark's goal tally first

Coaching career

Silberbauer became an assistant at Swiss Super League club FC Luzern in 2016. He remained with the club through the 2018–19 Swiss Super League season.

On 20 August 2018, Silberbauer was announced as the first head coach of Pacific FC of the Canadian Premier League on a 2-year contract beginning January 2019. On 28 April 2019, he coached Pacific to a 1–0 victory in its first ever game over HFX Wanderers FC. He parted ways with the club on 18 October the same year.

On 17 August 2020 it was confirmed, that Silberbauer had returned to Denmark and joined FC Midtjylland as an assistant coach for the club's successful U-19 team.

On 15 June 2021 Swiss club FC Basel announced, that Silberbauer had been hired on a deal for the 2021–22 season, as the clubs new assistant coach under head coach Patrick Rahmen. He left the club at the end of 2022. On 24 March 2022, he joined FC Utrecht, also as assistant, under manager Rick Kruys. Ahead of the 2022-23 season, Silberbauer returned to his homeland and joined his former club, FC Midtjylland, as a first team assistant coach.

On 28 December 2022, Silberbauer returned to FC Utrecht, this time as head coach, agreeing upon a 2.5-year contract.

Managerial statistics

Honours
Copenhagen
Danish Superliga: 2003–04, 2005–06, 2006–07

References

External links
Michael Silberbauer profile Dansk Boldspil-Union
Silberbauer Michael on FC Biel-Bienne
Michael Silberbauer profile Voetbal International 

1981 births
Living people
Danish men's footballers
Association football wingers
Denmark youth international footballers
Denmark under-21 international footballers
Denmark international footballers
AaB Fodbold players
F.C. Copenhagen players
FC Utrecht players
BSC Young Boys players
Odense Boldklub players
FC Biel-Bienne players
Pacific FC non-playing staff
Danish Superliga players
Swiss Super League players
Eredivisie players
Danish expatriate men's footballers
Expatriate footballers in the Netherlands
Expatriate footballers in Switzerland
Danish expatriate sportspeople in the Netherlands
Danish expatriate sportspeople in Switzerland
UEFA Euro 2012 players
People from Rebild Municipality
Sportspeople from the North Jutland Region
Danish football managers
Canadian Premier League coaches
FC Utrecht managers
Eredivisie managers